Quentin Still (born 8 August 1974) is a South African cricketer. He played in 39 first-class and 2 List A matches from 1992/93 to 2000/01.

References

External links
 

1974 births
Living people
South African cricketers
Border cricketers
Northerns cricketers
Cricketers from Pietermaritzburg